Jill Quertier (born 1936) is an English set decorator. She won an Academy Award in the category Best Production Design for the film Shakespeare in Love and was nominated for another for Quills.

Selected filmography 
 Shakespeare in Love (1998; won with Martin Childs)
 Quills (2000; nominated with Martin Childs)

References

External links 

1936 births
Living people
People from Bromley
English set decorators
Best Art Direction Academy Award winners